St. Joseph's Secondary School, also known as Saint Joseph's Convent School or as Convent School, is a Catholic secondary school in Freetown, Sierra Leone, established in 1868. It is affiliated to Saint Joseph's Primary School (Sierra Leone) and to St. Edward's Primary School and St. Edward's Secondary School, all also in Freetown.

Notable alumni
Bertha Conton
Patricia Kabbah

References

Sources
St Joseph's Secondary School Home page.
St Joseph's Ex-Pupils Association
"Sierra Leone: St. Joseph's Convent Principal 'Begs'". Via AllAfrica, 2 October 2006.

External links 
 Official website

 St Joseph's Inter Alumnae Association website

Catholic schools in Sierra Leone
Educational institutions established in 1868
Schools in Freetown